Frederick Arthur "Fritz" Henderson (born November 29, 1958) was President and Chief Executive Officer of General Motors. Prior to his appointment as CEO on March 31, 2009, Henderson was the Vice President of General Motors and had been with the company since 1984. Frederick Henderson resigned as the CEO of General Motors on December 1, 2009.

He replaced Rick Wagoner as CEO of GM when Wagoner stepped down after serving in that position for eight years, at the request of President Barack Obama in relation to the General Motors Chapter 11 reorganization. Henderson assumed the new position on March 31, 2009.

Early life and education
Henderson was born in Detroit, Michigan. He is a 1976 graduate of Lake Orion High School in Lake Orion, Michigan.

He holds a Bachelor of Business Administration degree from the University of Michigan's Ross School of Business and a Master of Business Administration degree from Harvard Business School.  During his time at Michigan, Henderson pitched for the University of Michigan Wolverines baseball team.

Career
Henderson joined General Motors in 1984. He held a number of positions with the company until 1992 when he became GMAC group vice president of finance in Detroit. From 1997 to 2000, he was GM vice president and managing director of GM do Brasil covering GM operations in Brazil, Argentina, Paraguay, and Uruguay. He was successful in introducing small, inexpensive cars such as the Celta subcompact and the Meriva microvan, both produced in Brazil.

In June 2000, he was appointed group vice president and president of GM-LAAM (Latin America, Africa and Middle East) and in January 2002, he moved to Singapore as president of GM Asia Pacific where he was successful in expanding operations in Korea and China.

In 2004, Henderson was appointed chairman of GM Europe, based in Zurich, Switzerland, where he undertook substantial restructuring including significant reductions in jobs. After becoming vice chairman and chief financial officer in January 2006, in March 2009, he became GM president and chief operating officer.

On December 1, 2009, Henderson resigned from General Motors as CEO and was replaced by board Chairman Edward Whitacre, Jr., former head of AT&T Inc., who temporarily was CEO while a global search for a new permanent replacement is conducted. January 25, 2010 Ed Whitacre announces he will become the permanent CEO while keeping his current chairman of board of directors role. On February 19, 2010, GM announced that Henderson would serve as a consultant on their international operations, to be paid $59,090 per month ($709,080 per year).

On September 2, 2010, Sunoco, Inc. announced that Henderson would join the company as senior vice president, and that he will lead the company's SunCoke Energy unit as chairman and CEO when it is spun off in 2011.

On June 11, 2018, Adient plc announced that Henderson would replace former CEO R. Bruce McDonald as interim CEO, pending a search for a full-time replacement for McDonald.

Personal life
Henderson is married to Karen Henderson and has two daughters, Sarah and Emily Henderson.

References

|-

1958 births
Harvard Business School alumni
Living people
Businesspeople from Detroit
American chief executives in the automobile industry
Ross School of Business alumni
General Motors former executives
Michigan Republicans
American chief financial officers